The Journal of Drug Issues is a quarterly peer-reviewed medical journal covering the adverse effects of drugs, especially illicit drugs. It was established in 1971 and is published by SAGE Publications in association with the Florida State University College of Criminology and Criminal Justice. The editor-in-chief is Kevin Beaver of the same university. According to the Journal Citation Reports, the journal has a 2017 impact factor of 1.304, ranking it 27th out of 35 journals in the category "Substance Abuse".

References

External links

Addiction medicine journals
Publications established in 1971
Quarterly journals
English-language journals
SAGE Publishing academic journals